Homogryllacris is a genus of Orthopterans, sometimes known as 'leaf-folding crickets' in the tribe Gryllacridini.  A key to species is provided by Bian, Jing Liu & Zizhong Yang, which have a recorded distribution in: India, China and Indochina (but locality records may be incomplete).

Species 
The Orthoptera Species File lists:
 Homogryllacris anelytra Shi, Guo & Bian, 2012
 Homogryllacris armigera Ingrisch, 2018
 Homogryllacris artinii (Griffini, 1913)
 Homogryllacris ascenda Shi, Guo & Bian, 2012
 Homogryllacris biloba (Bey-Bienko, 1957)
 Homogryllacris brevipenna Du, Bian & Shi, 2016
 Homogryllacris brevispina Shi, Guo & Bian, 2012
 Homogryllacris buyssoniana (Griffini, 1912)
 Homogryllacris curvicauda Du, Bian & Shi, 2016
 Homogryllacris gladiata Liu, 2007 - type species (locality Suqiyu, Hunan Province)
 Homogryllacris hamitis Liu & Bian, 2021
 Homogryllacris kurseonga (Griffini, 1913)
 Homogryllacris maindroni (Griffini, 1913)
 Homogryllacris obtusitubera Li, Dou & Shi, 2019
 Homogryllacris parcibrevipenna Liu, Lu & Bian, 2021
 Homogryllacris platycis Liu & Bian, 2021
 Homogryllacris rufovaria Liu, 2007
 Homogryllacris stabilis Ingrisch, 2018
 Homogryllacris yunnana Shi, Guo & Bian, 2012

References

External Links

Ensifera genera
Gryllacrididae
Orthoptera of Indo-China